Eshmenan Talem (also Romanized as Eshmenān Ţālem; also known as Eshmenānz̧ālem) is a village in Kateh Sar-e Khomam Rural District, Khomam District, Rasht County, Gilan Province, Iran. At the 2006 census, its population was 848, in 219 families.

References 

Populated places in Rasht County